Morgan Academy is a Secondary School in the Stobswell area of Dundee, Scotland.

History
The building was designed in 1862 by the Edinburgh architects John Dick Peddie and Charles Kinnear, opening in 1866 as the Morgan Hospital, a charitable institution providing accommodation and education for "sons of tradesmen and persons of the working class generally whose parents stand in the need of assistance". In 1888, Morgan Hospital closed and a year later in 1889, the school opened as Morgan Academy, often referred to by alumni as "The Morgan" or simply "Morgan".  The architecture is designated as a Category 'A' listing by Historic Scotland.

Its benefactor was John Morgan, the son of a Dundee maltman, who emigrated to India at the age of 20 where, with his brother, he became a wealthy indigo farmer. Upon his death in 1850 he bequeathed much of his fortune to establish a residential institution. The hospital closed in 1888 and was bought by the members of the Dundee Burgh School Board, who re-opened it as a school.

Grammar school
Until the advent of comprehensive education in the late 1960s and early 1970s, there were mainly two types of high school in Scotland: junior secondaries where students left school at 16 and began preparation for one of the trades or entered the workforce, and academies where students remained until the end of fifth or sixth year and took highers before normally going to college or university. Morgan functioned in the latter category.

Comprehensive
Morgan Academy became a comprehensive school in 1972, although the school was still called an academy rather than a high school.

Fire 
The school suffered a fire on 21 March 2001 which destroyed much of the building. It was rebuilt using the original facade and much of the internal appearance.

Re-opening
The newly rebuilt Morgan Academy was re-opened in November 2004, by then Minister for Education and Young People Peter Peacock MSP.

Present day 
A portrait of John Morgan, found in the basement of the McManus Galleries, was unveiled at newly rebuilt school and placed on show in the Great Hall of the school.

The school consists of three houses, named after three Scottish castles: Airlie, Cortachy and Mains which compete annually in the House Championship and also elect House Captains, formerly one male and one female but now three of any gender combination, from Sixth Year. Originally four houses, the three aforementioned plus Glamis, which was dissolved in 2011.

Alumni

Grammar school
 Prof Raymond Keiller Butchart FRSE mathematician
 Sir Stewart Duke-Elder, important ophthalmologist, former Editor of the British Journal of Ophthalmology, and Surgeon Oculist for 29 years to the Royal Family
 Rt Rev Frederick Easson, Bishop of Aberdeen and Orkney from 1956–72
 John Gordon, Editor from 1928-52 of the Sunday Express, and President from 1948-9 of the Institute of Journalists
 Ian Kennedy (comic artist)
 Prof Malcolm Longair CBE, Jacksonian Professor of Natural Philosophy from 1991-2005 at the University of Cambridge, and Head of Physics from 1998–2005
 Ian McDiarmid, actor (Return of the Jedi), and theatre director at the Almeida Theatre
 James McIntosh Patrick, painter
 William McKelvey, Labour MP from 1983-97 for Kilmarnock and Loudoun, and from 1979-83 for Kilmarnock
 Sir George Matthew McNaughton CB, civil engineer
 Prof Andrew Ronald Mitchell, Professor of Mathematics at the University of St Andrews
 Scott Murray – rugby union player
 Henry Nicoll – cricketer
 Walter Perry, Baron Perry of Walton OBE, first Vice-Chancellor from 1969-81 of the Open University, and former Professor of Pharmacology at the University of Edinburgh
 Peter Rhind – cricketer
 Air Marshal Sir Ernest Sidey CB, Director-General from 1971-74 of RAF Medical Services, and from 1974-85 of the Chest, Heart and Stroke Association (now known as The Stroke Association)
 George Simpson, Baron Simpson of Dunkeld, Chief Executive from 1996-2001 of GEC (from 1999 known as Marconi), and from 1994-6 of Lucas Industries
 Alexander Steele – Rhodesian-born architect and cricketer
 Sir Gordon Sutherland, physicist, expert on Raman spectroscopy, Director for 1956-64 of the National Physical Laboratory, President from 1964-6 of the Institute of Physics, and Master of Emmanuel College, Cambridge from 1964–77
 David Whitton, Labour MSP from 2007-11 for Strathkelvin and Bearsden
 Prof Derek Bell, President Royal College of Physicians Edinburgh

Notable faculty
 David Dougal Williams Artist and assistant Art Master at Morgan Academy from 1922-1929.

References

External links 
 Academy home page
 Morgan Academy's page on Scottish Schools Online

Infrastructure completed in 1868
Category A listed buildings in Dundee
Secondary schools in Dundee
1889 establishments in Scotland
Listed schools in Scotland
Educational institutions established in 1889